The Roman Catholic Diocese of Mangalore is a diocese located in the city of Mangalore in the Ecclesiastical province of Bangalore in India. The diocese falls on the southwestern coast of India. At present, it comprises the whole civil districts of Dakshina Kannada and Udupi in Karnataka state. The area of the Diocese was collectively referred to as South Canara during the Company rule in India, in the subsequent British India after Direct rule from London commenced & in the early post-independence Bombay state, prior to the States Reorganisation Act (1956). It was established as a separate Apostolic Vicariate from the Apostolic Vicariate of Verapoly in 1853, and was promoted to a diocese on 1 September 1886.

On Monday, July 16, 2012, it lost territory when Pope Benedict XVI erected the new Roman Catholic Diocese of Udupi (made up of the three civil townships of Udipi, Karkala& Coondapoor), which will also become part of the Province of Bangalore.

Bishops of the Diocese of Mangalore

Ordinaries
 Bishop Peter Paul Saldanha (15 September 2018 – present)
 Bishop Aloysius Paul D'Souza (8 November 1996 – 15 September 2018)
 Bishop Basil Salvadore D'Souza (22 March 1965 – 5 September 1996)
 Bishop Raymond D'Mello (5 February 1959 – 21 April 1964)
 Bishop Basil Salvador Theodore Peres (4 January 1956 – 24 April 1958)
 Bishop Victor Rosario Fernandes (16 May 1931 – 4 January 1956)
 Bishop Valerian Joseph D'Souza (1928 – 14 August 1930)
 Bishop Paolo Charles Perini, S.J. (Apostolic Administrator 1923 – 1928)
 Bishop Paolo Charles Perini, S.J. (17 August 1910 – 12 June 1923)
 Bishop Abbondio Cavadini, S.J. (26 November 1895 – 26 March 1910)

Vicar Apostolics of Mangalore (Latin Rite)
 Bishop Ephrem-Edouard-Lucien-Théoponte Garrelon, O.C.D. (3 June 1870 – 11 April 1873)
 Bishop Michael Antony of St. Louis O.C.D. (1853-1870)
 Bishop Bernardine of St. Agnes, O.C.D. (1845-1853)
 Bishop Thomas de Castro (1674-1684)

Auxiliaries
 Bishop Aloysius Paul D'Souza (11 January 1996 – 8 November 1996)

Deaneries
Below are the Deaneries of Mangalore Diocese
 Bantwal Varado
 Moodbidri Varado (Central Varado)
 Central Varado (Cordel)
 Puttur Varado (Eastern Varado)
 Episcopal City Varado (Rosario Cathedral)
 Belthangady Varado (Mangalore East Varado)
 Kinnigoli Varado (Mangalore North Varado)
 Mudipu Varado (Mangalore South Varado)
 Pezar Varado
 Bela Varado (Southern Varado)
 St. John Paul II - New Vara do
 Mother Theresa Varado (Surathkal Varado)

Saints and causes for canonisation
 St. Mariam Baouardy helped found the missionary Carmel of Mangalore.
 Servant of God Raymond Francis Camillus Mascarenhas
 Amelia Cimolino

See also

 Apostolic vicariate
 Church of Most Holy Saviour, Agrar
 Church Of Sacred Heart Of Jesus, Madanthyar
 Belthangady Varado
 Monsignor Ambrose Madtha
 Most Holy Redeemer Church, Belthangady
 Diocese of Belthangady
 St. John the Baptist Church, Permude
 St. Joseph's Monastery, Bikarnakatte
 St. Patrick Church, Siddakatte
Cathedral of Our Lady of Miracles

References

External links
Official website of the Mangalore Diocese
History of the Mangalore Diocese
History of the Mangalore Diocese
Mangalore Diocese on Catholic Hierarchy
Mangalore Diocese on Catholic Encyclopedia
Mangalore Diocese on GCatholic.org

Christianity in Mangalore
Mangalore
Religious organizations established in 1853
1853 establishments in India
Mangalore
1853 establishments in British India